Rolfes may refer to:

Surname
Christine Rolfes (born 1967), American politician
Hans Rolfes (1894–1935), German flying as
Herman Rolfes (born 1936), Canadian politician
Simon Rolfes (born 1982), German footballer

Given name
Rolfes Robert Reginald Dhlomo (1906–1971), South African journalist and novelist

See also
Rolfe (disambiguation)